James Jackson Lenox-Conyngham Chichester-Clark (September 1884 – 31 January 1933) was a Member of Parliament of the House of Commons of Northern Ireland for South Londonderry from 1929 until his death; his mother-in-law was elected to replace him at the subsequent by-election. His son James Chichester-Clark later became Prime Minister of Northern Ireland. In the period before his death, he also served as County Londonderry Grand Master of the Grand Orange Lodge of Ireland, being a member of Castledawson LOL 96.

Born James Jackson Lenox-Conyngham Clark, the son of James Jackson Clark and grandson of James Johnston Clark at Largantogher House, Maghera. He was married to Marion Caroline Dehra Chichester, daughter of Dame Dehra Parker and had three children; James Chichester-Clark, Baron Moyola, Robin Chichester-Clark and Penelope Hobhouse.

References

External links 
 Northern Ireland House of Commons bios

1884 births
1933 deaths
People from Maghera
Ulster Unionist Party members of the House of Commons of Northern Ireland
Members of the House of Commons of Northern Ireland 1929–1933
Members of the House of Commons of Northern Ireland for County Londonderry constituencies